Aplexa rivalis is a species of small air-breathing freshwater snail, an aquatic pulmonate gastropod mollusk in the family Physidae, a family which are sometimes known as the bladder snails.

Description
Rivalis Aplexa has a thin shell levorotatory, featuring a large oval opening with parietal callus lip sharp and wide. The tentacles are filiform and foot is very long in the back. Ovigerous masses are constituted by transparent oval eggs variable number embedded in a gelatinous mass.

Distribution 
This species occurs in:
 Brazil
 Venezuela

Ecology
Chaetogaster limnaei and Nais communis were found to be associated with Aplexa rivalis in Brazil. In Venezuela it is found inhabiting ornamental ponds in the leaves of plants and vegetable crops, and are common in aquarium shops.

See also
 List of non-marine molluscs of El Hatillo Municipality, Miranda, Venezuela

References

External links
 ZipcodeZoo.com: Aplexa rivalis 
 Biodiversity Heritage Library: Aplexa rivalis

Physidae
Gastropods described in 1807
Taxa named by Thomas Rackett